Winguric or Wingurich ( 4th century AD), also known as Wingureiks, Wingourichos, also Jungeric  was a Gothic ruler (reiks) under the Thervingian chieftain Athanaric who played a prominent role in the Gothic persecution of Christians. Around 375 he burned twenty-six Gothic Christians to death in the Crimea, who were later sanctified as martyrs by the Christian church.

Winguric is identified by name in the Menologion of Basil II and the Synaxarion of Constantinople. He was one of the unnamed "envoys" of Athanaric mentioned by Sozomen.

References

Bibliography

 
 
 
 
 

4th-century Gothic people
Persecution of early Christians
4th-century monarchs in Europe